Soryong (소령) is a South Korean rank which is equivalent to a major and to a lieutenant commander. The South Korean insignia consists of a single star burst collar insignia.

The North Korean rank equivalent is known as sojwa with an insignia consisting of a shoulder board similar to the old Soviet rank of major.

Military ranks of South Korea